The 2021 Cal Poly Mustangs football team represented California Polytechnic State University in the 2021 NCAA Division I FCS football season. The Mustangs were led by 2nd-year head coach Beau Baldwin and played their home games at Alex G. Spanos Stadium as members of the Big Sky Conference.

Previous season
The Mustangs finished the 2020 season 0–3 to finish in eighth place. On March 29, 2021, Cal Poly announced that it would opt out of the remainder of the 2021 spring season, citing safety issues related to the COVID-19 pandemic and numerous injuries to players.

Preseason

Polls
On July 26, 2021, during the virtual Big Sky Kickoff, the Mustangs were predicted to finish twelfth in the Big Sky by the coaches and last in the media.

Preseason All–Big Sky team
The Mustangs did not have any players selected to the preseason all-Big Sky team.

Schedule

Game summaries

at San Diego

at Fresno State

South Dakota

at No. 4 Montana

No. 19 Weber State

at No. 10 Montana State

No. 10 UC Davis

at Portland State

at No. 16 Sacramento State

Idaho State

Northern Arizona

References

Cal Poly
Cal Poly Mustangs football seasons
Cal Poly Mustangs football